Bodegraven is a railway station in Bodegraven, Netherlands. The railway station was opened in 1878, when the rail connection between Leiden and Utrecht was opened. The first station building had to be demolished in 1894 as a result of subsidence. The second building was destroyed in a fire in 1911. The current station was built in 1913.

The train service at this station received modern double decker units in 2007, previously being Old stock from the 1960s.

Train services
The following services call at Bodegraven:
2x per hour intercity service Leiden - Alphen aan den Rijn - Utrecht

External links
NS website 
Dutch Public Transport journey planner 

Railway stations in South Holland
Railway stations opened in 1878
Bodegraven-Reeuwijk